Grassroots DICOM or GDCM (originally called GNU DiCoM; the name was changed at a request for integration in ITK, followed by a change in license), is a cross-platform library written in C++ for DICOM medical files. It is automatically wrapped to Python/C#/Java & PHP (using SWIG). It supports RAW, JPEG (lossy/lossless), J2K, JPEG-LS, RLE and deflated. It also comes with DICOM Part 3,6 & 7 of the standard as XML files. It can be used to build a JPIP or WADO server.

Since release 2.2.0 the toolkit comes with an SCU implementation for:
 C-ECHO
 C-STORE
 C-FIND
 C-MOVE

See also

ImageMagick
VTK
ITK
CMake
OpenJPEG
IJG JPEG
DCMTK

References

External links

SourceForge project page
Historical GDCM 1.x page

C++ libraries
Graphics libraries